The 1909 Southwestern Louisiana Industrial football team was an American football team that represented the Southwestern Louisiana Industrial Institute (now known as the University of Louisiana at Lafayette) as an independent during the 1909 college football season. In their second year under head coach Clement J. McNaspy, the team compiled a 5–2–2 record.

Schedule

References

Louisiana Ragin' Cajuns football seasons